John McComb Jr. (1763 – 1853) was an American architect who designed many landmarks in the 18th and 19th centuries. Between 1790 and 1825, McComb was New York city's leading architect.

John McComb Jr. was born on October 17, 1763 in New York City. In 1783, McComb began working with his father, John McComb Sr., a well known architect and surveyor. In 1790, he began working independently.

McComb is interred at Green-Wood Cemetery in Brooklyn, New York.

Work
 Old Cape Henry Light (1792), first lighthouse totally authorized by the federal government.
 Montauk Point Lighthouse (1796)
 Station Eatons Neck Lighthouse (1798)
 Gracie Mansion (1799)
 St. Mark's Church in-the-Bowery (1799)
 Hamilton Grange (1802)
 New York City Hall (1803)
 St. John's Chapel (New York City) (1803, demolished 1918)
 Old Queens building at Rutgers University (1808)
 Castle Clinton (1808)
 Alexander Hall, Princeton Theological Seminary (1815)

Gallery

References

External links 
 The John McComb Architectural Drawings at the New York Historical Society

18th-century American architects
Lighthouse builders
1763 births
1853 deaths
Burials at Green-Wood Cemetery
Federalist architects
19th-century American architects
Architects from New York City
Scottish American